Zyklon was a Norwegian blackened death metal band formed in 1998 by Samoth and Trym of Emperor, along with members of Myrkskog. Their style has been described as modern death metal with black and industrial undertones. After more than a two-year hiatus, the band officially split up in January 2010.

All the band's lyrics were written by former Emperor drummer Faust, then member of Casey Chaos' side project Scum and Italian industrial black metal band Aborym.

Despite Samoth having been in a previous Emperor side project called Zyklon-B, the two are not related; Zyklon B is the name of a lethal gas used by the Nazis during the Holocaust; "Zyklon" is, according to Samoth, a play on the word "cyclone", since the word is spelled syklon in Norwegian.

History

Zyklon's debut album, World ov Worms (2001), showcased fast riffing and blast beats. However, after this release, Zyklon's line-up changed drastically, and the official line-up became Samoth, Trym Torson, Destructhor, and Secthdamon.

The band's second album, Aeon (2003), exposed the band to media attention, and videos were made for two tracks, "Core Solution" and "Psyklon Aeon".

The band's third effort was recorded from November to December 2005 at the Akkerhaugen Lydstudio in Norway; Disintegrate was released in May 2006. In October 2007, the band went on hiatus, before splitting up 15 months later.

Members

Last line-up
Secthdamon – vocals, bass (2001–2010)
Samoth – guitar (2000–2010)
Destructhor – guitar (2000–2010)
Trym – drums (2000–2010)

Former members
Daemon – vocals (2000–2001)
Cosmocrator – bass (2000–2001)

Discography
World ov Worms (2001)
Aeon (2003)
Split with Red Harvest (CD, 2003)
Disintegrate (2006)
The Storm Manifesto (compilation of all previous recorded works) (CD, 2010)

DVDs
Storm Detonation Live (2006)

Music videos 
 "Psyklon Aeon"
 "Core Solution"

References

External links

Nocturnal Art Samoth's record label
Zyklon at Metal Storm
Zyklon interview with Samoth for The Lodge
Exclusive interview with Trym for The Lodge

Norwegian blackened death metal musical groups
Musical groups established in 1998
1998 establishments in Norway
Musical groups disestablished in 2010
2010 disestablishments in Norway
Musical quartets
Musical groups from Norway with local place of origin missing 
Candlelight Records artists